In mathematics, an exp algebra is a Hopf algebra Exp(G) constructed from an abelian group G, and is the universal ring R such that there is an exponential map from G to the group of the power series in R[[t]] with constant term 1. In other words the functor Exp from abelian groups to commutative rings is adjoint to the functor from commutative rings to abelian groups taking a ring to the group of formal power series with constant term 1.

The definition of the exp ring of G is similar to that of the group ring Z[G] of G, which is the universal ring such that there is an exponential homomorphism from the group to its units. In particular there is a natural homomorphism from the group ring to a completion of the exp ring. However in general the Exp ring can be much larger than the group ring: for example, the group ring of the integers is the ring of Laurent polynomials in 1 variable, while the exp ring is a polynomial ring in countably many generators.

Construction

For each element g of G introduce a countable set of variables gi for i>0. Define exp(gt) to be the formal power series in t

The exp ring of G is the commutative ring generated by all the elements gi with the relations

for all g, h in G; in other words the coefficients of any power of t on both sides are identified.

The ring Exp(G) can be made into a commutative and cocommutative Hopf algebra as follows.  The coproduct of Exp(G) is defined so that all the elements exp(gt) are group-like. The antipode is defined by making exp(–gt) the antipode of exp(gt). The counit takes all the generators gi to 0.

 showed that Exp(G) has the structure of a λ-ring.

Examples

The exp ring of an infinite cyclic group such as the integers is a polynomial ring in a countable number of generators gi where g is a generator of the cyclic group. This ring (or Hopf algebra) is naturally isomorphic to the ring of symmetric functions (or the Hopf algebra of symmetric functions).
 suggest that it might be interesting to extend the theory to non-commutative groups G.

References

Hopf algebras